The 2012 German Grand Prix, formally the Formula 1 Grosser Preis Santander von Deutschland 2012, was a Formula One motor race that took place on 22 July 2012 as the tenth round of the 2012 season.

Ferrari driver Fernando Alonso got his 22nd pole position before going on to win the race.

Report

Background
As there was no race at Hockenheim in 2011, 2012 was the first year that the drag reduction system (DRS) and Pirelli tyres featured at the circuit. The DRS detection zone for the race was located at turn four, with the activation zone located  further down the road, so that it could be used on the approach to the hairpin.

Tyre supplier Pirelli chose to run with the most commonly run tyre combination of the year to date, and brought its white-banded medium compound tyre as the harder "prime" tyre and the yellow-banded soft compound tyre as the softer "option" tyre  to the Hockenheim circuit.

Driver penalties
Romain Grosjean took a five-place grid penalty after his team discovered a terminal issue in his gearbox. Nico Rosberg and Mark Webber were also given five-place penalties for gearbox changes. Sergio Pérez was given a five-place grid penalty for impeding Fernando Alonso and Kimi Räikkönen in the second qualifying session.

Drivers
Dani Clos took over Narain Karthikeyan's HRT during the first free practice session. Jules Bianchi replaced Paul di Resta at Force India, while Valtteri Bottas once again drove Bruno Senna's Williams for the same session. This race marked Lewis Hamilton's 100th race and Kamui Kobayashi's 50th race.

Race
Fernando Alonso won the race, his 30th in Formula One to become the only driver to win three races at this point in the season, Jenson Button was 2nd after Sebastian Vettel was given a 20 second time penalty for passing the former by going off the track, the penalty dropped the German down to 5th. Michael Schumacher got the 77th and final fastest lap of his Formula One career.

Classification

Qualifying

Notes:
 — Romain Grosjean, Nico Rosberg and Mark Webber were each demoted five places as a penalty for changing their gearboxes before the race.
 — Sergio Pérez was demoted five places as a penalty for impeding Fernando Alonso and Kimi Räikkönen in the second qualifying session.

Race

Notes:
 — Sebastian Vettel was given a 20 second post-race drive-through penalty for an illegal overtaking manoeuvre on Jenson Button on lap 66, dropping him from second to fifth.

Championship standings after the race

Drivers' Championship standingsConstructors' Championship standings

 Note: Only the top five positions are included for both sets of standings.

See also 
 2012 Hockenheimring GP2 Series round
 2012 Hockenheimring GP3 Series round

References

German
German Grand Prix
Grand Prix
July 2012 sports events in Germany